Arthur Dewey may refer to:

Arthur E. Dewey, U.S. Assistant Secretary of State
Arthur J. Dewey, U.S. biblical scholar